Scolopocerus is a genus of leaf-footed bugs in the family Coreidae. There are at least four described species in Scolopocerus.

Species
These four species belong to the genus Scolopocerus:
 Scolopocerus granulosus Barber, 1914
 Scolopocerus neopacificus Brailovsky, 1989
 Scolopocerus secundarius Uhler, 1875
 Scolopocerus uhleri Distant, 1881

References

Further reading

External links

Articles created by Qbugbot
Coreini
Coreidae genera